Bence Bedi (born 14 November 1996) is a Hungarian professional footballer who plays for Zalaegerszeg.

Career statistics
.

References

 
 

1996 births
Living people
People from Nagykanizsa
Hungarian footballers
Association football midfielders
Zalaegerszegi TE players
Nemzeti Bajnokság I players
Hungary under-21 international footballers
Sportspeople from Zala County